The Empire Award for Best Director is an Empire Award presented annually by the British film magazine Empire to honor directors working within the film industry.

History
The Empire Award for Best Director was one of five awards which were first introduced at the 1st Empire Awards ceremony in 1996 (the others being Best Actor, Best Actress, Best Film and Best British Film) with Danny Boyle receiving the award for his direction of Shallow Grave. Winners are voted by the readers of Empire magazine.

Since its inception, the award has been given to 16 directors. Christopher Nolan has received the most awards in this category with three awards. Christopher Nolan and Peter Jackson were nominated on seven occasions, more than any other director. Kathryn Bigelow and Patty Jenkins are the only female directors to be nominated for the award. Rian Johnson is the most recent winner in this category for his direction of Star Wars: The Last Jedi.

Winners and nominees
In the list below, winners are listed first in boldface, followed by the other nominees. The number of the ceremony (1st, 2nd, etc.) appears in parentheses after the awards year, linked to the article (if any) on that ceremony.

"†" indicates Academy Award for Best Director winner

"‡" indicates Academy Award for Best Director nominee

1990s

2000s

2010s

Notes

Multiple awards and nominations

Multiple awards
The following individuals received two or more Best Director awards:

Multiple nominations
The following individuals received two or more Best Director nominations:

References

External links

Director
Awards for best director